Seaman 1st Class is the fifth album and fifteenth Bravo stand-up comedy special by stand-up comedian Kathy Griffin, and her seventeenth overall.

Track listing

Personnel

Technical and production
Kathy Griffin - executive producer
Jenn Levy - executive producer
Paul Miller - executive producer
Kimber Rickabaugh - executive producer
Jeff U'ren - film editor
Bruce Ryan - production designer
Cisco Henson - executive in charge of production
Lesley Maynard - production supervisor
David Crivelli - technical supervisor
Gene Crowe - stage manager, associate director

Visuals and imagery
Ashlee Mullen - make-up artist
Charles Baker Strahan - hair stylist
Alan Adelman - lighting designer

Award and nominations
The live Bravo performance special was nominated for the Grammy for Best Comedy Album in the 55th Grammy Awards.

References

External links
Kathy Griffin's Official Website

Kathy Griffin albums
Stand-up comedy albums
2012 live albums